The Communauté de communes de Miribel et du Plateau is a communauté de communes in the Ain département and in the Auvergne-Rhône-Alpes région of France. It was established on 31 December 1997. Its area is 65.6 km2, and its population was 24,062 in 2018.

Composition 
This Communauté de communes includes the following 6 communes:

Administration

President

See also 
Communes of the Ain department

References

Miribel plateau
Miribel
Auvergne-Rhône-Alpes region articles needing translation from French Wikipedia